"Tweeter and the Monkey Man" is a song by the British-American supergroup the Traveling Wilburys that first appeared on the 1988 album Traveling Wilburys Vol. 1.

Background
The songwriting credit goes officially to all members of the band, but the song is published by Bob Dylan's Special Rider Music label, indicating that the main writer is Dylan, who is also the lead singer on the record. This is partially contradicted by George Harrison's account of the song in the 2007 documentary The True History of the Traveling Wilburys:

"Tweeter and the Monkey Man" was really [written by] Tom Petty and Bob [Dylan].  Well, Jeff [Lynne] were there too, but they were just sitting there around in the kitchen, and he was for some reason talking about all this stuff that didn't make much sense, you know, and we got a tape cassette and put it on and then transcribed everything they were saying.

Harrison also recalled that he and Lynne then contributed the chorus, beginning with the line "And the walls came down", based on an idea of Dylan's from the same tape.

"Tweeter and the Monkey Man" is sometimes regarded as a playful homage to the songs of Bruce Springsteen, who was often hailed as "the next Dylan" early in his career. The lyrics include the titles of many Springsteen songs, and the song borrows many of Springsteen's themes.  The setting of the song itself is New Jersey, Springsteen's home state and the setting for many of Springsteen's own songs.  New Jersey locations such as Rahway Prison and Jersey City are mentioned by name. Springsteen song title references include: "Stolen Car", "Mansion on the Hill", "Thunder Road", "State Trooper", "Factory", "The River", and a song made popular by Springsteen but written by Tom Waits, "Jersey Girl". Additionally, "Lion's Den" and "Paradise" are each mentioned and prominently enunciated in the song, each being the title of a Springsteen song released after the Traveling Wilburys album.

Only Dylan, Harrison, Petty and Lynne took part in recording the song. This is the only Wilburys song on Vol. 1 not to feature Roy Orbison on lead or backing vocals.

Composition and lyrical content
Dylan sings lead on the song's verses, with the rest of the group joining, except Orbison, singing backup on the chorus sections. At five verses in 5 minutes 27 seconds, "Tweeter and the Monkey Man" is the longest Traveling Wilburys song put to record.

The song tells the story of two drug dealers – Tweeter and the Monkey Man – their nemesis, the "Undercover Cop", and the cop's sister, Jan, a longtime love interest of the Monkey Man. Some lyrics raise a question regarding Tweeter's gender identity, for example: "Tweeter was a boy scout / before she went to Vietnam ..." Later in the song, Jan is quoted as saying of Tweeter, "I knew him long before he ever became a Jersey girl."

Throughout the ballad, the demise of Tweeter, the Monkeyman and the Undercover Cop, as well as Jan's fate, are examined.

Personnel
The Traveling Wilburys
Bob Dylan – lead vocals, acoustic guitar, backing vocals
George Harrison – acoustic guitar, dobro, slide guitar, backing vocals
Jeff Lynne – acoustic guitar, bass guitar, keyboards, backing vocals
Tom Petty – acoustic guitar, backing vocals

Additional musicians
Jim Keltner – drums
Jim Horn – saxophones
Ray Cooper – percussion

Cover versions
Canadian rock band Headstones recorded a cover of the song for their 1993 debut album Picture of Health. It was released as the album's third single in 1994 and became a radio hit in Canada. The lyrics were changed somewhat, including eliminating the implication of Tweeter changing genders and replacing some American references with Canadian ones, such as the inclusion of the band's hometown of Kingston.

Tom Petty and the Heartbreakers performed a cover of the song several times in 2013, including the Beacon Theatre on May 20, the Bonnaroo Music & Arts Festival on June 14, and the Firefly Music Festival (Dover, DE) on June 22. The performance from the Beacon appears on the group's digital album Live 2013.

P. Paul Fenech (the Meteors) covered this song on his solo album International Super Bastard in 2010.

Freek de Jonge recorded a version in Dutch on his 2002 album Parlando, under the title "Libelle en mug".

Moses Wiggins covered the song on the 2004 album Troubadour (renamed in 2007 Songs of Bob Dylan).

References

External links
 Comment by Morten Felgenhauer on George Starostin's Music Reviews site – Discussing the song and Springsteen connections.
 "Tweeter and the Monkey Man" page at The Dylan Lyric Commentaries
 Explanation and analysis of the song at everything2.com.

1988 songs
1994 singles
Traveling Wilburys songs
Headstones (band) songs
Songs written by Bob Dylan
Songs written by Tom Petty
Songs written by George Harrison
Songs written by Jeff Lynne
Songs written by Roy Orbison
Song recordings produced by Jeff Lynne
Song recordings produced by George Harrison
Songs about criminals
Songs about drugs
Transgender-related songs
Songs about primates